The Human Flame is a supervillain in DC Comics' main shared universe. He is mostly known as an enemy of Martian Manhunter.

Publication history
He first appeared in Detective Comics #274 (December 1959), and was created by Jack Miller and Joe Certa.

The character was not used again for 48 years, before reappearing to play an important role in Final Crisis. The writer, Grant Morrison, explained why they picked such an obscure character:

Human Flame is the featured character in the six-issue limited series Final Crisis Aftermath: Run!, written by Lilah Sturges, with art by Freddie Williams.

Fictional character biography
Michael Miller, the Human Flame, was a minor villain who, early in his career, was captured by the Martian Manhunter and incarcerated. He was the first actual supervillain the Manhunter faced.

After this one-off appearance, he was not seen in publication for nearly fifty years. In 2008's Justice League of America (vol. 2), he was seen robbing a bank, leading to a reluctant confrontation with Red Arrow and Hawkgirl. It was stated in this issue that in the context of the DC Universe that eight years had passed since his arrest in Detective Comics #274.

Final Crisis

He enlisted with Libra and the Secret Society of Super Villains. As a reward for joining him, Libra promised him power and his heart's desire: "revenge against the Martian Manhunter".

Following the events of Salvation Run, the Martian Manhunter was released from his imprisonment on Cygnus 4019 by Libra at the behest of the Human Flame. Preaching about granting the Society's wildest dreams, Libra stabs the Manhunter with his flaming staff while the Human Flame looks on, his wish having been the first granted by Libra. He films the murder to post on the internet later. While dying, Martian Manhunter telepathically attacked the super villains present with visions of their deaths by their arch-rivals with Vandal Savage imagining being killed by Manhunter himself. The Human Flame is ignored and cowers from the side.

The Human Flame is given a new upgraded suit by Libra. The helmet Libra shoves onto Human Flame's head emits the Anti-Life Equation turning Human Flame into a mindless drone known as a Justifier. Libra even used the Human Flame amongst other Justifiers to persuade Lex Luthor to swear an allegiance to Darkseid or be turned into a Justifier. The Human Flame was among the Justifiers under Lex Luthor's control that were fighting the Female Furies.

In the limited series Final Crisis Aftermath: Run!, the Human Flame had a wife and child, but was divorced. The Human Flame tries to hide while pursued by the Kyrgyzstani Mafia for stealing a cache of money, the villains that Libra enslaved during the Final Crisis, and the Justice League members John Stewart and Firestorm. His costume is badly damaged during a fight with the mob, and the Human Flame seeks out Heat Wave, hoping to purchase one of his signature flamethrower guns. Heat Wave refuses, denouncing him as "pathetic", and gives him a harsh beating. Wounded and unable to afford health care, the Human Flame visits General Immortus who turns him over to Professor Milo. Milo fixes his injuries, and adds cybernetic parts, adding strength and invulnerability, and implanted flamethrowers in his chest, mouth and arms. However, to ensure the Human Flame's loyalty, Immortus has his flamethrowers rigged to cause intense pain whenever he uses them, and orders him to kill Immortus' foe, N-Emy (whom General Immortus blamed for stealing something from him).

The Human Flame later attempts some freelance jobs, stealing from a bank with the help of Seductress (one of the augmented henchmen and lover of Immortus himself) and swaying her to his side, but he's quickly discovered and charged with treason by Milo and Immortus, who try to shut down his powers with a remote control. With Seductress rushing again to his aid, the Human Flame is able to escape destroying the remote but injuring himself in the process.

Human Flame discovers that his new cyborg body has uncanny recuperative abilities that fix the broken jaw suffered during his escape. He fights his former allies successfully, killing them all until Immortus shuts down his powers with a secondary, wireless remote. The Human Flame then regains his powers by sheer will (even the augmented powers), badly burning Immortus. He then tortures Professor Milo to get further augmentations to put him on par with the Justice League and everyone else wanting vengeance against him. Milo sends him to S.T.A.R. Labs to get himself infused with atomic energy in a new experimental process. There, Human Flame and Seductress are attacked by a Hyper-Griffin, thus alerting S.T.A.R.'s security (actually one lone scientist) who agrees to give Human Flame the energy infusion to dispatch the Hyper-Griffin, although the energy infusion is temporary unless Human Flame can reach a nearby nuclear power plant and bathe in its energies, even though he risks death and a deadly meltdown. Despite the risks, he leaves Seductress behind and dupes John Stewart into dunking him in the main reactor. As a result, the nuclear plant is engulfed in a fiery explosion.

Despite the magnitude of the explosion, so powerful that the assembled heroes barely manage to contain it with their maximum efforts, Flame emerges as a fiery, radioactive being, in a molten approximation of a human body, able to increase his mass and density. Calling himself the Inhuman Flame, he rampages through the city until he increases his mass to such a degree that he becomes basically immobile. Realizing that the Flame, in his quest for power, hadn't even taken into account the idea of becoming "smaller", Firestorm, Red Tornado, and John Stewart take him to outer space, tethered to heat-dispersing rod to sap his thermic-based powers. As a final revenge, and to add insult to injury, Stewart creates a cell-phone construct and takes a photo of the captive Human Flame, stressing the similarities to Martian Manhunter's fate.

DC Universe
In 2016, DC Comics implemented another relaunch of its books called "DC Rebirth", which restored its continuity to a form much as it was prior to "The New 52". Human Flame was seen at the second-best western hotel where the Legion of Doom Villains Mixer was being held at.

Powers and abilities
When he first appears, Human Flame has no powers, but wears a costume with twelve flame-throwing nozzles on the chest.

As a part of the Run series, he is shown being turned into a cyborg with an enhanced physique, partial body armor and a series of flame-spewing nozzles implanted in his chest, belly, face, mouth and hands. He further enhances his body by an experimental radioactive infusion process: as a result, he gains a metahuman body composed of molten material, able to increase his mass and density at will and radiate high temperature radiations. In this new form he's shown to be unable, whether due to a physical limitation or simply because he is incapable of thinking that way, to reduce his increased mass, becoming in a short while a behemoth so heavy and dense that he loses the ability to move.

Throughout his attempt to escape the heroes hunting him, he was represented as an incompetent crook who gets lucky because nobody expects anything of him, allowing him to evade capture as they cannot predict his methods, although his fixation on acquiring more power and anger at his own view of life's mistreatment of him eventually allow the heroes to catch up with him.

In other media
Human Flame appears in Harley Quinn. He is seen in the episode "Something Borrowed, Something Green" as one of the villains attending the wedding of Poison Ivy and Kite Man.

References

External links
 
 FINAL CRISIS FLASHBACK: Libra & Human Flame, Comic Book Resources, June 5, 2008
 Human Flame at the DC Database Project

Comics characters introduced in 1959
DC Comics cyborgs
DC Comics characters with superhuman strength
DC Comics male supervillains
Fictional murderers
Fictional characters with fire or heat abilities